Lyseren is a lake in the municipalities of Enebakk and Spydeberg in Viken county, Norway.

Lake Lyseren has a key role in the murder mystery unfolding in the Norwegian detective thriller "The Leopard". Some episodes in the book feature police detectives from cosmopolitan Oslo coming to conduct investigations in the rural  environment of Lyseren.

See also
List of lakes in Norway

Enebakk
Spydeberg
Lakes of Viken (county)